Postarthroscopic glenohumeral chondrolysis (PAGCL) is a rare complication of arthroscopic surgery and involves chondrolysis wherein the articular cartilage of the shoulder undergoes rapid, degenerative changes shortly after arthroscopic surgery.

Causes
Bupivacaine, lidocaine, ropivacaine and levobupivacaine are all toxic to cartilage and their intra-articular infusions can lead to this toxic effect. Intra-articular pain pumps with local anesthetics have been implicated as a potential cause.

Diagnosis

Treatment

Total Joint Arthroplasty or reverse total joint arthroplasty (shoulder replacement surgery)

References

Orthopedic surgical procedures
Local anesthetics
Chondropathies
Rare diseases
Rheumatology